Scott Laughton (born May 30, 1994) is a Canadian professional ice hockey centre and alternate captain for Philadelphia Flyers of the National Hockey League (NHL).

Growing up in Oakville, Ontario, Laughton spent his junior hockey career playing for the Toronto Marlboros Minor Midget AAA of the Greater Toronto Hockey League (GTHL) before being drafted by the Oshawa Generals of the Ontario Hockey League. Following his sophomore season in the Ontario Hockey League (OHL), Laughton was drafted in the first round, 20th overall, by the Philadelphia Flyers in the 2012 NHL Entry Draft.

Internationally, Laughton has represented Canada at various tournaments including the World U-17 Hockey Challenge and IIHF World U18 Championship.

Early life
Laughton was born on May 30, 1994, in Oakville, Ontario, Canada to parents Craig and Bonnie. His dad coached him in hockey from the age of five to 14, when Laughton began to play major junior hockey in the Ontario Hockey League (OHL). He also captained the Mimico Mountaineers Peanut Rep lacrosse team in 2000 and led them to an undefeated season. Growing up, he was a fan of Roy Halladay of the Toronto Blue Jays.

Playing career

Youth
Growing up in Oakville, Ontario, Laughton attended Holy Family Elementary School and Holy Trinity High School while captaining the Toronto Marlboros Minor Midget AAA of the Greater Toronto Hockey League (GTHL). While playing for the team, he named Jarome Iginla and Steven Stamkos as his role models and inspiration. In his final season with the Marlboros, Laughton also skated in two games with the St. Michael's Buzzers of the Central Canada Hockey League (CCHL). He concluded the 2009–10 GTHL season with 55 goals and 40 assists in 76 games for the Marlboros.

As a result of his minor hockey achievements, Laughton was drafted third overall in the 2010 OHL Selection Draft by the Oshawa Generals. In his rookie season with the Generals, Laughton skated in 63 games and accumulated 12 goals with 11 assists as the team qualified for the 2011 OHL playoffs. On December 28, 2010, Laughton was named an assistant captain for Team Ontario while competing at the 2011 World U-17 Hockey Challenge. During the postseason, Laughton recorded one goal and one assist over 10 games as the Generals fell to the Niagara IceDogs. Following his first season in the OHL, Laughton was invited to compete with Team Canada at the 2011 Ivan Hlinka Memorial Tournament, where he won a gold medal.

Laughton returned to the Generals for his sophomore campaign during the 2011–12 season, where he recorded  21 goals and 32 assists over 64 games. His play earned him a roster spot on the CHL/NHL Top Prospects Game, and a ranking of 40th amongst all North American skaters in the NHL Central Scouting Bureau's mid-season rankings. As a result, Laughton was named to Team Canada's roster for the 2012 IIHF World U18 Championships, during which he recorded seven points and led the team to a bronze medal. In spite of his strong season, the Generals failed to qualify past the first round of the 2012 OHL Playoffs, losing to the IceDogs in six games.

Following his sophomore season, Laughton was drafted in the first round, 20th overall, by the Philadelphia Flyers in the 2012 NHL Entry Draft. He signed a three-year, entry-level contract with the Flyers on August 8, 2012, but returned to the OHL for the 2012–13 season. He was suspended twice during the season, resulting in him only playing 49 games. His first suspension came on October 24, as a result of a hit during a game against the Ottawa 67s. Upon coming back from his 10-game suspension, Laughton said "I want to finish every check, I think I did that (in Sunday's return) and I don't want to stray away from my game at all." His second multi-game suspension of the season occurred on April 8, 2013, following a hit on Zach Hall of the Barrie Colts. In spite of this, Laughton recorded a career high 56 points over 49 games to conclude the season.

Professional
Following the 2012–13 NHL lockout, Laughton made the Flyers out of the team's abbreviated training camp and made his NHL debut on January 19, 2013, at home against the Pittsburgh Penguins. He played 12:14 of ice time alongside Wayne Simmonds and Matt Read in the 3–1 loss, giving the Flyers five more games to decide whether he remained in the NHL or returned to major juniors. After going pointless in five games with the Flyers, Laughton was reassigned to the OHL where he competed in the 2013 OHL Playoffs and recorded 13 points in seven games. Following their second round elimination, he was promoted to the Flyers' American Hockey League (AHL) affiliate, the Adirondack Phantoms, for the remainder of the season.

Following the Flyers 2013–14 preseason training camp, Laughton was loaned back to the Oshawa Generals of the OHL after failing to remain with the NHL club to start the season. When reflecting on his training camp experience, he admitted to feeling overconfident and did not "play to his ability." In his first game back in the OHL on October 3, 2013, Laughton recorded four points in an eventual 7–1 win over the Peterborough Petes. He continued to have a breakout season and recorded 24 goals and 26 assists in 29 games by December, earning him the captaincy title for Team Canada's U20 team at the 2013 World Junior Ice Hockey Championships. He ended the season as the second-leading scorer for the Generals as Oshawa finished first in the OHL's East Division and reached the Eastern Conference finals. On May 14, 2014, Laughton was named to the OHL's First All-Star Team. Flyers head coach Craig Berube later said that choosing to reassign Laughton to the OHL "helped him" and called him "one of the best players in all of junior hockey."

Laughton was invited to the Flyers' training camp prior to the 2014–15 season, but was reassigned to their new AHL affiliate, the Lehigh Valley Phantoms, on October 1, 2014 after being a healthy scratch for one game. To begin his first full professional season, Laughton was recognized with the CCM/AHL Player of the Week award after recording four goals in two games during the week ending on October 19. He was recalled to the NHL on December 3 and recorded his first career NHL goal 10 days later during a 5–1 win over the Carolina Hurricanes on December 13, 2014. Laughton split the rest of the season between the AHL and the NHL, recording 27 points over 39 games for the Phantoms and six points in 31 NHL games.

For the third time in his NHL career, Laughton made the Flyers' opening night roster prior to the 2015–16 season. He played in 71 games for the Flyers in a bottom six role and recorded seven goals and 14 assists for 21 points. As the Flyers met with the Washington Capitals during the 2016 Stanley Cup playoffs, Laughton suffered an injury following a collision into the boards and was stretchered off the ice. He was released from the hospital the following day but the team announced he would not rejoin the lineup. Following his shortened post-season berth, Laughton returned to the Flyers during their 2016 preseason games but suffered a lower-body injury and was expected to miss 3 to 4 weeks at the beginning of the 2016–17 season. He was then reassigned to the Phantoms for the majority of the season but was protected by the Flyers in the 2017 NHL Expansion Draft. On July 11, 2017, the Flyers re-signed Laughton to a two-year, $1.925 million contract worth $962,500 annually.

In the final year of his contract, Laughton continued to fill the role of a third and fourth line center and penalty killer for the Flyers. Playing in his sixth professional season, he set a new career-high in goals, assists, and points over 82 games, the first full season in his NHL career. He spent the majority of his playing time alongside Taylor Leier, Michael Raffl, or Jordan Weal and ended the season with the team's third best possession numbers. Their play was noticed by hockey scouts, who said their pairing had the possibility to be "the best fourth line in the league." As a free agent at the conclusion of the season, the Flyers re-signed Laughton to a two-year, $4.6 million contract worth $2.3 million annually on July 12, 2019.

Laughton suffered a broken finger on his right hand at the start of the 2019–20 season during the second period of a 7–4 win over the Columbus Blue Jackets, and was expected to miss four weeks. He was activated off injured reserve nearly a month later on November 22 following surgery to repair his finger. Following his return, he suffered a groin injury in December which sidelined him for seven more games. In spite of his slow start due to injury, the 2019–20 season proved to be his best to date, with a new career-high in goals set with 13 for a total of 27 points through 49 games. He played on the third, fourth, and second line throughout the shortened season while averaging 14:36 of ice time per game. The team rewarded his efforts by gifting him the team's 2020 Pelle Lindbergh Memorial Trophy as the team's most improved player. 

When the NHL returned to play after being delayed due to the COVID-19 pandemic in North America, Laughton and the Flyers faced off against the Montréal Canadians in the first round of the Stanley Cup Playoffs as the first seed in the East after winning the round robin qualifying tournament. During the series, he played on a line with Kevin Hayes and Travis Konecny. Laughton recorded a two-goal and one assist game on August 6 to send the Canadians on the brink of elimination. They pushed past the Canadians the following game to qualify for the Second Round of the 2020 Stanley Cup playoffs against the New York Islanders. As they faced elimination against the Islanders by Game 5, Laughton helped the team recover from a lost lead and recorded the overtime game winning goal off an assist from Konecny. It was his second point of the night and first overtime goal (playoff or regular season) in his career. As a result, Laughton became the sixth player in franchise history to score an overtime goal to keep the team in the series. During the next game, he recorded the game-tying shorthanded goal in the third period in an eventual 5–4 overtime win to send the series to Game 7. The Flyers would lose Game 7 to the Islanders 4–0, with Laughton recording a fight and six hits in the shutout.

On February 7, 2021, Laughton recorded his first career hat trick in a 7–4 win against the Washington Capitals, with goals on Vítek Vaněček and Craig Anderson. On the last day of the NHL trade deadline, Laughton signed a five-year, $15 million contract extension with the Flyers.

Career statistics

Regular season and playoffs

International

Awards and honors

References

External links
 

1994 births
Living people
Adirondack Phantoms players
Canadian ice hockey centres
Lehigh Valley Phantoms players
National Hockey League first-round draft picks
Oshawa Generals players
People from Oakville, Ontario
Philadelphia Flyers draft picks
Philadelphia Flyers players
Toronto Marlboros players